Ectopsocopsis cryptomeriae, the large-winged psocid, is a species of outer barklouse in the family Ectopsocidae. It is found in the Caribbean, Europe and Northern Asia (excluding China), Central America, North America, Oceania, South America, and Southern Asia.

References

Ectopsocidae
Articles created by Qbugbot
Insects described in 1907